Hans Stürm (1874–1933) was a German actor, screenwriter and playwright. He worked with the director Richard Eichberg on a number of films either in acting of scripting roles. His stage play The Unfaithful Eckehart was turned into films in 1931 and 1940.

Selected filmography
 The Pied Piper of Hamelin (1918)
 The Foreign Prince (1918)
 The Golem: How He Came into the World (1920)
 Lady Hamilton (1921)
 Monna Vanna (1922)
 The Game with Women (1922)
 The Treasure of Gesine Jacobsen (1923)
 Living Buddhas (1925)
 Love and Trumpets (1925)
 The Woman with That Certain Something (1925)
 The Girl on the Road (1925)
 Passion (1925)
 The Motorist Bride (1925)
 Chaste Susanne (1926)
 The Girl on a Swing (1926)
 Princess Trulala (1926)
 The Serfs (1928)

References

Bibliography
 Ann C. Paietta. Saints, Clergy and Other Religious Figures on Film and Television, 1895–2003. McFarland, 2005.

External links

Hans Sturm at filmportal.de

1874 births
1933 deaths
German male screenwriters
German male stage actors
German male film actors
German male silent film actors
20th-century German male actors
Actors from Dresden
Film people from Dresden
20th-century German screenwriters